Live for Today is an EP by Delaware band, Boysetsfire. It contains three studio recordings as well as three live recordings. The studio songs are from the sessions for the Tomorrow Come Today album, on which "Release the Dogs" and "Bathory's Sainthood" would eventually be released. "Curtain Call" is an exclusive song for this EP. The live songs are from the After the Eulogy and the Tomorrow Come Today albums.  They were recorded at Club Krome in South Amboy, New Jersey on July 19, 2002.

Track listing
 "Release the Dogs" – 3:08
 "Bathory's Sainthood" – 4:19
 "Curtain Call" – 3:06
 "After the Eulogy [Live]" – 3:57
 "Handful of Redemption [Live]" – 4:14
 "Rookie [Live]" – 4:37

References

Boysetsfire albums
Albums produced by Dave Fortman
2002 live albums
Wind-up Records live albums